Tour of Azerbaijan 2010 was the 25th running of the Tour of Iran (Azerbaijan), which took place between 3 May 3 and 8 May 2010 in Iranian Azerbaijan and in the Autonomous Republic of Nakhichivan. The tour had 6 stages in which Ghader Mizbani from Iran won the first place in overall classification of the tour.

Stages of the tour

General classification

External links
 https://www.youtube.com/watch?v=t9XaGXzys2E

References

Tour of Azerbaijan (Iran)